Mike Vanhamel  (born 16 November 1989) is a Belgian professional footballer who plays for Beerschot Wilrijk in the Belgian First Division A.

Career
Vanhamel began his career at R.S.C. Anderlecht before joining to R. Charleroi S.C. in 2005, where he stayed for one season before moving to Oud-Heverlee Leuven, playing in the EXQI-League. At OH Leuven he played his first official game fon 17 September 2006 against Hamme. In 2007, he left Leuven after two seasons, moving to Ligue 2 club Le Havre AC. There played his first game on 16 May 2008 against Bastia and played his first game in Ligue 1 against Nice. In August 2011 he returned to Belgium, signing a contract for three years with K.V.C. Westerlo playing in the Jupiler League. On 25 July 2012, he signed a one-year contract with French Ligue 2 club Stade Laval, with an option for another one. After his contract had expired mid 2014, Vanhamel signed a one-year deal with Dutch Eerste Divisie side NEC. He then switched clubs each season, moving to Lierse, Oostende and Beerschot Wilrijk.

Honours

Club
NEC
Eerste Divisie: 2014–15
WS Bruxelles
Belgian Second Division: 2015–16

References

External links

1989 births
Living people
Association football goalkeepers
Belgian footballers
Belgium under-21 international footballers
Belgium youth international footballers
R.S.C. Anderlecht players
R. Charleroi S.C. players
Oud-Heverlee Leuven players
Le Havre AC players
K.V.C. Westerlo players
Stade Lavallois players
NEC Nijmegen players
RWS Bruxelles players
Lierse S.K. players
K.V. Oostende players
K Beerschot VA players
Challenger Pro League players
Belgian Pro League players
Ligue 2 players
Eerste Divisie players
Belgian expatriate footballers
Expatriate footballers in France